Peotone Township is located in Will County, Illinois. As of the 2010 census, its population was 4,431 and it contained 1,728 housing units. Peotone was formed from the eastern half of Wilton Township at an unknown date. It has towns of Andres and Peotone. Interstate 57, Route 50, Route 45, and Route 52 are major routes.

Geography
A description of the township appears at the bottom of the 1873 plat atlas and it reads "...This is an entirely prairie township which a rich, fertile soil, and for agricultural purposes and grain raising is second, perhaps, to none in the county." The land of Peotone Township is very gently rolling and becomes even flatter as you move south in the township. The major waterways in Peotone township include the South Branch Forked Creek, Rock Creek, and Black Creek. Other water includes the Peotone Park District.

Demographics

Infrastructure
In the 1960s Interstate 57 was built and it passes through the east half of Peotone Township. An exit and entrance ramp off the interstate serves as a main entrance to the town of Peotone. While I-57 borders Peotone's west village limits, Route 50 passes through the east side of town. Many of Peotone's businesses are located on along Route 50. Running parallel to Route 50 for much of its path through Peotone Township is the Canadian National Railway. The village of Peotone sprung up alongside this railroad in 1856. The railroad is what brought early settlers to the township. Another main route that passes through Peotone Township is Route 45. The Peotone Township stretch of Route 45 was completely resurfaced during the summer of 2008, following a winter full of angry motorists complaining about the serious pothole condition of the highway, which had gotten to be a public safety hazard.

Events
Peotone is known county-wide for the Will County Fair the town has hosted for more than 100 years. At the northwest corner of Peotone-Wilmington Road and West Street, the Will County Fairgrounds provides a great place to meet up with friends and family and say goodbye to summer every August.

References

External links
City-data.com
Will County Official Site
Illinois State Archives

Townships in Will County, Illinois
Townships in Illinois